Manuel Alberto Claro (born 3 April 1970) is a Chilean-Danish cinematographer, filmmaker, and still photographer. He has won numerous accolades, including two Robert Awards, a Bodil Award, and a European Film Award.

Life and career 
Manuel Alberto Claro was born in Santiago, Chile in 1970. In 1974, he moved to Denmark and since that time lives in Copenhagen.

He graduated as a stills photographer from Milan's Istituto Europeo di Design in 1994 and then worked as an assistant photographer in Milan, New York City and Copenhagen before enrolling at the National Film School of Denmark in 1997, from where he graduated in 2001.

Since 2001 he has shot a number of features among them Reconstruction, which won the Camera d'Or in Cannes 2003 and the Bronze Frog at Camerimage 2004. Dark Horse which premiered in Un Certain Regard in Cannes 2005. Allegro which premiered at Venice Film Festival 2005 and for which he won both the Robert and the Bodil 2006 awards for best cinematography. He has been a frequent collaborator with director Lars von Trier in Melancholia, Nymphomaniac, and The House that Jack Built.

He also works on commercials for companies like IKEA, Nokia, and Volkswagen, and on music videos for the likes of FKA Twigs, Paloma Faith, and Rhye. He is an active member of the Danish Society of Cinematographers.

Filmography

Feature films 
  (2003)
 Reconstruction (2003)
 Scratch (2003)
  (2004)
   (2004)
 Dark Horse (2005)
 Allegro (2005)
 Weapons (2007)
  (2007)
  (2008)
  (2008)
 The Candidate (2008)
 Everything Will Be Fine (2010)
 Melancholia (2011)
 Nymph()maniac (2013)
 Top Five (2014)
 The Untamed (2016)
 The House That Jack Built (2018)

Short films 
 Anxiety (2001)
 Visions of Europe (2004, segment "Europe Does Not Exist")

Awards 
 2003: Golden Plaque for Reconstruction, Chicago International Filmfestival
 2004: Bronze Frog for Reconstruction, Camerimage
 2006: Robert for Allegro
 2006: Bodil Award for Best Cinematographer for Allegro and Dark Horse
 2010: Bodil Award for Best Cinematographer for Antichrist
 2011: European Film Award
 2012: Bodil Award for Best Cinematographer for Melancholia

References

Further reading

External links 
 
 
 Manuel Alberto Claro at Danish Association of Cinematographers

1970 births
20th-century Danish photographers
21st-century Danish photographers
Best Cinematographer Bodil Award winners
Chilean emigrants to Denmark
Danish cinematographers
Danish photographers
European Film Award for Best Cinematographer winners
Living people